Franz-Otto Krüger (1 April 1917 – 17 March 1988) was a German film and television actor. Krüger already started his acting at Berlin theatres in 1934, but his career was interrupted by his service in the Second World War. He appeared in over 125 film and television productions between 1947 and 1987, mostly in supporting roles. One of his first films was Roberto Rossellini's neorealist classic Germany, Year Zero.

In addition to acting, he also worked as a stage and television director in his later career. He was also employed as a voice actor and director of German dubbings. Krüger directed the German synchronisation versions of film classics like On the Waterfront, Bambi and The Great Dictator.

Selected filmography

 No Place for Love (1947) - Der Sehnsüchtige
 Germany, Year Zero (1948) - Karl-Heinz
 Everything Will Be Better in the Morning (1948) - Dr. Linck, Dichter
 The Berliner (1948) - Einbrecher Franz
 Nothing But Coincidence (1949) - Herr Osterloh
 One Night Apart (1950) - Herr Schlüsemann
 The Woman from Last Night (1950)
 When Men Cheat (1950)
 The Black Forest Girl (1950) - Conférencier
 Queen of the Night (1951) - Ganove
 The Heath Is Green (1951) - Zauberkünstler
 The Prince of Pappenheim (1952) - Alfons
 Mikosch Comes In (1952) - Fotograf
 Oh, You Dear Fridolin (1952) - Rundfunkreporter
 Fight of the Tertia (1952) - Landrat Knötzinger
 When the Heath Dreams at Night (1952)
 The Rose of Stamboul (1953) - Oberkellner
 Such a Charade (1953) - Gersdorf, Versicherungsagent
 Lady's Choice (1953)
 Red Roses, Red Lips, Red Wine (1953)
 The Cousin from Nowhere (1953) - Onkel Gustav
 My Sister and I (1954) - Justizminister
 The Big Star Parade (1954) - Quick-Redakteur (uncredited)
 Ten on Every Finger (1954)
 Stern von Rio (1955)
 Heroism after Hours (1955) - Fink (segment "Der Zauberer Maro")
 Before God and Man (1955)
 Meine Kinder und ich (1955)
 Alibi (1955) - Vilessen (uncredited)
 Studentin Helene Willfüer (1956) - Arzt
 Ein Herz schlägt für Erika (1956)
 Die wilde Auguste (1956) - Gerichtsvollzieher
 Beichtgeheimnis (1956) - Vorsitzender
 The Model Husband (1956) - 1. Argentinier
 Du bist Musik (1956) - Manager
 Musikparade (1956) - Ramon Ramirez
 Ein Mann muß nicht immer schön sein (1956) - Michael Schöder
 Das Mädchen Marion (1956) - Der Fremde
 Saison in Oberbayern (1956) - v. Krachenfels
  (1957) - Intendantur-Rat Häberlein
 Salzburg Stories (1957) - Hotelmanager
 Victor and Victoria (1957) - Kriminalkommissar
 Tired Theodore (1957) - Professor Erwin Link
 Aunt Wanda from Uganda (1957) - Detektiv (uncredited)
 The Simple Girl (1957) - Regisseur
 Banktresor 713 (1957) - Personalchef
 Witwer mit 5 Töchtern (1957)
 Vater sein dagegen sehr (1957) - Standesbeamter
 Egon, der Frauenheld (1957)
 Kein Auskommen mit dem Einkommen (1957) - Herr Bollmann
 Voyage to Italy, Complete with Love (1958) - Herr Duevenasch
 Schwarzwälder Kirsch (1958) - Polizeidirektor
 The Man Who Couldn't Say No (1958) - Kommisar Kümmelmann
 The Muzzle (1958) - Schibulski
 When She Starts, Look Out (1958) - Dirigent Erichsen (uncredited)
 The Crammer (1958) - Headmaster Gaspari
 Peter Voss, Thief of Millions (1958) - Uhl
 Bobby Dodd greift ein (1959)
 A Thousand Stars Aglitter (1959) - 1. Gläubiger (uncredited)
 An Angel on Wheels (1959) - Le dentiste
 Morgen wirst du um mich weinen (1959) - Angestellter
 Adorable Arabella (1959) - Herr Schnering
 Kein Engel ist so rein (1960) - Inspector
 The Avenger (1960) - Regie-Assistent Frankie
 We Will Never Part (1960) - Rosinelli
 Riviera-Story (1961) - Müllerbeer
 The Bird Seller (1962) - Kommissar (uncredited)
 So toll wie anno dazumal (1962) - Kellner-Bewerber (uncredited)
 Kohlhiesel's Daughters (1962) - Portier Müller
 Lieder klingen am Lago Maggiore (1962) - Direktor Dietrich
 Zwei blaue Vergissmeinnicht (1962) - Cortini
 Ein Ferienbett mit 100 PS (1965) - Herr Krone
 The Gorilla of Soho (1968) - Police Doctor
 The Man with the Glass Eye (1969) - Hotel porter
 The Love Mad Baroness (1970) - Dr. Nagel
 Gelobt sei, was hart macht (1972) - Nekeres (voice, uncredited)
 MitGift (1976) - Polo-Kommentator (voice, uncredited)
 Mr. Rossi Looks for Happiness (1976) - Puss in Boots (German version, voice, uncredited)
 Young Love: Lemon Popsicle 7 (1987) - Receptionist (voice, uncredited)

Bibliography
 Shandley, Robert R. Rubble Films: German Cinema in the Shadow of the Third Reich. Temple University Press, 2001.

External links

1917 births
1988 deaths
German male film actors
German male television actors
Male actors from Berlin
20th-century German male actors